The Knot Worldwide, formerly XO Group and The Knot Inc., is an American media and technology company that provides content, tools, products and services for couples who are planning weddings, creating a home, and starting a family. The company generates revenue through online advertising, merchandising, registry services, and publishing. In 2019, the company was created by a merger between predecessors XO Group, The Knot Inc. and WeddingWire.

History
David Liu, his wife Carley Roney and their business partners, Rob Fassino, and Michael Wolfson founded The Knot Inc. in 1996. They found that the internet could facilitate and reduce anxiety in the process of wedding planning between couples. The startup received seed financing from AOL, the partners launched The Knot brand as a portal on AOL.  In 1997, TheKnot.com launched on the internet.

The company launched an online gift registry in partnership with QVC and published its first book, The Knot Complete Guide to Weddings in the Real World. In December 1999, the company raised $35 million in an initial public offering.

On December 2, 2000, the company launched its own bridal magazine and went public. The Knot Weddings Magazine is published four times a year and is sold on newsstands.

In 2004, the company launched a television series, Real Weddings from The Knot, on the Oxygen Network.

The Nest brand launched in 2005 with a website aimed at newly married or cohabiting couples creating their new home.  A magazine followed in 2006.

In 2006, the company acquired WeddingChannel.com which included its registry platform and helped to consolidate the bridal media industry.

In 2008, the company launched TheBump.com to serve expectant and new parents. 

In June 2011, the company transferred its common stock listing to the New York Stock Exchange (NYSE) with the symbol "XOXO".

Mike Steib joined XO Group as president in July 2013  and assumed the role of CEO in March 2014.

In October 2015, XO Group announced the acquisition of GigMasters, an online marketplace for event vendors, and a partnership with Jetaport, the discounted hotel room block booking service. 

In September 2018, XO Group announced that it would merge with competing wedding planning firm WeddingWire and become a privately held company under the control of WeddingWire investors Permira Funds and Spectrum Equity. The merger became official in March 2019 and the new parent company was renamed to The Knot Worldwide.

In other media
In 2013, it was announced that 20th Century Fox was developing a film trilogy based on the websites The Knot, The Bump and The Nest with a script being written by Natalie Krinsky. However since then, no more news regarding the projects has been made.

References

External links

Mass media companies established in 1996
Companies formerly listed on the New York Stock Exchange
Mass media companies based in New York City
1996 establishments in New York City
1999 initial public offerings
2019 mergers and acquisitions